Laborie District is one of 10 districts (formerly quarters) of the Caribbean island nation of Saint Lucia. According to the 2002 census, the population of the Quarter was 7,414 people.

History
The first inhabitants of the Laborie general area, migrating from South America around 1000 a.c., were probably the Arawak Amerindians. Laborie, a southwestern fishing village named after the French governor Baron De Laborie, was once a turtle habitat.  French colonials were probably the first to settle what is now the village of Laborie, in the early 18th century.

Government 
The Laborie District is an electoral constituency and has been represented since July 2021 in the House of Assembly of Saint Lucia by Alva Baptiste Parliamentary Representative for the Laborie electoral constituency.

Notable people
Prominent Laborians include the second prime minister – and first being elected to the position following independence – of St. Lucia, Sir Allan Louisy; the 7th Prime Minister of St. Lucia, Dr. Kenny Anthony; and the Past Governor General, Dame Pearlette Louisy.

See also
Districts of Saint Lucia

References

Quarters of Saint Lucia
Subdivisions of Saint Lucia